James Arthur Walsh (born 15 May 1901 in Stockport) was a footballer who played for Liverpool from 1923 to 1928. He was Liverpool's top scorer during the 1923–24 with 19 goals in all competitions.

References

External links
Profile at LFCHistory.net

1901 births
1971 deaths
English footballers
Association football forwards
Liverpool F.C. players
Stockport County F.C. players
Hull City A.F.C. players
Crewe Alexandra F.C. players
Colwyn Bay F.C. players